The Traphill Historic District is a national historic district located at Traphill, Wilkes County, North Carolina. It encompasses 11 contributing buildings in the village of Traphill. The buildings largely date to the late-19th century and include the Joseph Bryan House (1847), Old Storehouse (c. 1850–1870), Tenant House and Barn, White-Hinson House (1882), Traphill Bargain House, Traphill Baptist Church (1887), Traphill Institute (1891), C. D. Holbrook House (c. 1905), C. D. Holbrook Store, and Traphill Methodist Church (1921).

It was listed on the National Register of Historic Places in 1980.

References

Historic districts on the National Register of Historic Places in North Carolina
Geography of Wilkes County, North Carolina
National Register of Historic Places in Wilkes County, North Carolina